is one of the termini on the Kobe Municipal Subway Kaigan Line in Chūō-ku, Kobe, Hyōgo Prefecture, Japan.

Free transfers are available from the Kaigan Line station to the Seishin-Yamate Line station, but passengers are limited to 90 minutes to change trains when using regular tickets and IC cards.

Layout
This station has an island platform serving two tracks.

Connections
 Sannomiya Station
JR West Tokaido Line (JR Kobe Line)
Sannomiya Station (others)
Port Liner (P01)

 (S03) 
Kobe-sannomiya Station
Hanshin Railway Main Line (HS 32)
Hankyu Railway Kobe Line, Kobe Kosoku Line (HK-16)

Surroundings
Kobe International House
Mizuho Bank, Ltd., Mizuho Trust & Banking Co., Ltd.
Kobe City Hall
Sumitomo Mitsui Banking Corporation
MUFG Bank, Ltd.
The Tokushima Bank, Ltd.
The Hyakujushi Bank, Limited
KEPCO Kobe Building

Stations of Kobe Municipal Subway
Railway stations in Hyōgo Prefecture
Railway stations in Japan opened in 2001